Àlex Brendemühl i Gubern (born 27 November 1972) is a Spanish-German actor. Born in Barcelona to a Spanish mother and a German father, he has appeared in more than 60 films and television shows since 1995. Brendemühl played the lead role of the Nazi war criminal Josef Mengele in the 2013 film The German Doctor.

Selected filmography
 In the City (2003)
 Inconscientes (2004)
  (2009)
 El cónsul de Sodoma (2009)
 Heroes (2010)
 The Mosquito Net (2010)
 Entrelobos (2010)
 Insensibles (2012, also known as Painless)
 The German Doctor (2013)
 Falling Star (2014)
 Ma Ma (2015)
 Chiamatemi Francesco (2015)
 From the Land of the Moon (2016)
 7 años (2016)
 Django (2017)
 Transit (2018)
 The Prayer (2018)
 Petra (2018)
 The Offering (2020)
 Staring at Strangers (2022)

References

External links

1972 births
Living people
20th-century Spanish male actors
21st-century Spanish male actors
Male actors from Barcelona
Spanish people of German descent
Spanish male film actors